The Vox Phantom is an electric guitar, originally released in 1962 by the Jennings company. It is unique for its distinctive, pentagonal shape, which became part of the iconic representation of the British Invasion. Originally made in England, manufacturing was later relocated to Italy.

Features of the Vox Phantom included 2 or 3 single-coil pickups, open-back tuners, and a Tune-o-matic bridge inspired by similar Gibson bridges. Later models included a Bigsby-inspired tremolo, designed by Vox's founder, Thomas Jennings. It included a round leather-coated pad on the back for comfort while playing. A 12-string version, the Phantom XII, was also made. Both 6- and 12-string guitars were also made as "Stereo" versions, capable of operating in stereo with a special cable which connected to two amplifiers simultaneously. This enabled complex panning and switching effects that were in vogue because Psychedelic rock was popular at the time.

Another variant of the Phantom guitar was the rare "Special", built in the UK then later in Italy, a white version being famously used by Ian Curtis in Joy Division's "Love Will Tear Us Apart" video. The Special included on-board effects such as fuzz, tremolo, and repeat percussion. Effects were operated by a series of push buttons along the bottom neck side of the pick guard, with knobs to control vibrato and repeat speed. The Special also had a built-in 'E' tuner, which could be used to create a drone effect.

Introduced in 1967, the "Vox V261 Delta" 6-string guitar shared the same body shape as the Phantom, but employed several 9-volt on-board effects, including an E tuner, distortion booster, treble and bass boosters and a repeat percussion effect. Instead of three single coil pickups, the Delta was fitted with two Vox Ferro-Sonic high output, wide range pickups, with rectangular black plastic surrounds. The headstock had a black finish and the VOX logo was inlaid in mother of pearl. The Delta came complete with a Bigsby-style tremolo as well. Only available in white, V261 Deltas were made for Vox in Italy by Eko. A bass version was also produced, with two Ferro-Sonic pickups. It is believed that the Delta was only available in 1967 and 1968.

The guitar shared many of the practical problems of similar unusually-shaped guitars, such as Gibson's Flying V. Its shape made it difficult to play sitting down, and its polyester finish scratched easily at its corners.

Numerous copies of the Vox Phantom's distinctive five-sided body design were manufactured, by companies such as Teisco and Kawai, under the Domino brand name. Contemporary copies are also manufactured by companies such as Eastwood Guitars (called the VG6) and Jay Turser (called the Phantasia). Jack Charles, of the US firm Phantom Guitarworks, continues to build replicas of the Phantom and other VOX models.

In the late 1990s, VOX reissued USA-built versions of the Phantom, Mark III Teardrop and Mando guitars. The USA models are considered to be the most playable versions of the instruments ever made according to The Ultimate Guitar Book by Tony Bacon

In 2011, VOX reintroduced the original pentagonal body shape in its Apache series. The travel guitar hosts a two-channel guitar amplifier, speakers, several rhythm patterns, and an E-String tuner.

Users of the Vox Phantom

 Tom Petty uses a 12-String in the Tom Petty and the Heartbreakers Video for "Refugee"
 Tony Hicks of The Hollies
 Dave Davies of The Kinks (he briefly used a 6-string as well as a 12-string model in 1964)
 Peter Jay and the Jaywalkers
 The Echoes (English group) The Echoes trailed most of the Vox equipment from 1962.
 Members of Paul Revere & the Raiders - used a Phantom IV bass and a Phantom VI in concert
 Members of The Electric Prunes
 Sterling Morrison of The Velvet Underground
 Captain Sensible of The Damned
 Johnny Thunders of The New York Dolls
 Stiv Bators can be seen using and holding one in many pictures and on various album covers.
 There are pictures of Dee Dee Ramone of The Ramones using them, although it is unknown whether or not he owned one.
 Benjamin Orr of The Cars
 Larry Winther of The Mummies plays a beat up white V261 Delta.
Greg Kihn had a Phantom XII
 Ian Curtis of Joy Division - owned three Phantoms, two white Phantom VI Specials with push button effects and a black Phantom (model unknown). One of his white Phantom VI Specials appears in the video for "Love Will Tear Us Apart."
Bernard Sumner of New Order - especially used from the song "Everything's Gone Green"
 Daniel Hunt of Ladytron
 Richard Hawley of Pulp - uses a Teisco copy of a Phantom in concert
 Rudi Protrudi - uses a black & white Vox Phantom VI in - The Fuzztones: where the band logo consists of two crossed Vox Phantoms guitars 
 Anton Newcombe of The Brian Jonestown Massacre used a black Phantom XII for sometime before switching to a Vox Starstream XII and ultimately a Vox Ultrasonic.
 Courtney Taylor-Taylor of The Dandy Warhols can be seen in the Documentary DIG!
 Ukigumo of Tokyo Jihen
 Dave Gregory has a white Phantom VI and played in the XTC Video for "The Ballad of Peter Pumpinkhead"
 Bernie LaBarge owns a black Vox Phantom Stereo 12-string, and used it on his 1981 hit "Dream Away".
 Paul Saulnier from PS I Love You uses a Vox Phantom XII Stereo guitar in the video for Facelove (from Meet Me At The Muster Station, 2010).
 Brian Jones of the Rolling Stones sometimes used a Vox Phantom
 Heather Baron-Gracie of Pale Waves uses a custom black 6-string Phantom and a white 12-string Phantom
 Egyptian Guitarist Omar Khorshid in an episode of TV Show Ahlan w Sahlan.
 Jimmy Page used a Phantom 12 string both in the Yardbirds and in Led Zeppelin

References

Electric guitars
1963 musical instruments